Freeman John Dyson  (15 December 1923 – 28 February 2020) was an English-American theoretical physicist and mathematician known for his works in quantum field theory, astrophysics, random matrices, mathematical formulation of quantum mechanics, condensed matter physics, nuclear physics, and engineering. He was Professor Emeritus in the Institute for Advanced Study in Princeton and a member of the Board of Sponsors of the Bulletin of the Atomic Scientists.

Dyson originated several concepts that bear his name, such as Dyson's transform, a fundamental technique in additive number theory, which he developed as part of his proof of Mann's theorem; the Dyson tree, a hypothetical genetically engineered plant capable of growing in a comet; the Dyson series, a perturbative series where each term is represented by Feynman diagrams; the Dyson sphere, a thought experiment that attempts to explain how a space-faring civilization would meet its energy requirements with a hypothetical megastructure that completely encompasses a star and captures a large percentage of its power output; and Dyson's eternal intelligence, a means by which an immortal society of intelligent beings in an open universe could escape the prospect of the heat death of the universe by extending subjective time to infinity while expending only a finite amount of energy.

Dyson disagreed with the scientific consensus on climate change. He believed that some of the effects of increased CO levels are favourable and not taken into account by climate scientists, such as increased agricultural yield, and further that the positive benefits of CO likely outweigh the negative effects. He was skeptical about the simulation models used to predict climate change, arguing that political efforts to reduce causes of climate change distract from other global problems that should take priority.

Biography

Early life 
Dyson was born on 15 December 1923, in Crowthorne in Berkshire, England. He was the son of Mildred and the composer George Dyson, who was later knighted. His mother had a law degree, and after Dyson was born she worked as a social worker. Dyson had one sibling, his older sister, Alice, who remembered him as a boy surrounded by encyclopedias and always calculating on sheets of paper. At the age of four he tried to calculate the number of atoms in the Sun. As a child, he showed an interest in large numbers and in the solar system, and was strongly influenced by the book Men of Mathematics by Eric Temple Bell. Politically, Dyson said he was "brought up as a socialist".

From 1936 to 1941 Dyson was a scholar at Winchester College, where his father was Director of Music. At the age of 17 he studied pure mathematics with Abram Besicovitch as his tutor at Trinity College, Cambridge, where he won a scholarship at age 15. During this stay, Dyson also practiced night climbing on the university buildings, and once walked from Cambridge to London in a day with his friend Oscar Hahn, nephew of Kurt Hahn, who was a wheelchair user due to polio.

At the age of 19 he was assigned to war work in the Operational Research Section (ORS) of RAF Bomber Command, where he developed analytical methods for calculating the ideal density for bomber formations to help the Royal Air Force bomb German targets during the Second World War. After the war, Dyson was readmitted to Trinity College, where he obtained a BA degree in mathematics. From 1946 to 1949 he was a fellow of his college, occupying rooms just below those of the philosopher Ludwig Wittgenstein, who resigned his professorship in 1947.

In 1947 Dyson published two papers in number theory. Friends and colleagues described him as shy and self-effacing, with a contrarian streak that his friends found refreshing but intellectual opponents found exasperating. "I have the sense that when consensus is forming like ice hardening on a lake, Dyson will do his best to chip at the ice", Steven Weinberg said of him. His friend the neurologist and author Oliver Sacks said: "A favourite word of Freeman's about doing science and being creative is the word 'subversive'. He feels it's rather important not only to be not orthodox, but to be subversive, and he's done that all his life."

Career in the United States 
On G. I. Taylor's advice and recommendation, Dyson moved to the United States in 1947 as a Commonwealth Fellow for postgraduate study with Hans Bethe at Cornell University (1947–1948). There he made the acquaintance of Richard Feynman. Dyson recognized the brilliance of the flamboyant American and worked with him. He then moved to the Institute for Advanced Study (1948–1949), before returning to England (1949–51), where he was a research fellow at the University of Birmingham. In 1949, Dyson demonstrated the equivalence of two formulations of quantum electrodynamics (QED): Richard Feynman's diagrams and the operator method developed by Julian Schwinger and Shin'ichirō Tomonaga. He was the first person after their creator to appreciate the power of Feynman diagrams and his paper written in 1948 and published in 1949 was the first to make use of them. He said in that paper that Feynman diagrams were not just a computational tool but a physical theory and developed rules for the diagrams that completely solved the renormalization problem. Dyson's paper and also his lectures presented Feynman's theories of QED in a form that other physicists could understand, facilitating the physics community's acceptance of Feynman's work. J. Robert Oppenheimer, in particular, was persuaded by Dyson that Feynman's new theory was as valid as Schwinger's and Tomonaga's. Also in 1949, in related work, Dyson invented the Dyson series. It was this paper that inspired John Ward to derive his celebrated Ward–Takahashi identity.

Dyson joined the faculty at Cornell as a physics professor in 1951, though he still had no doctorate. In December 1952, Oppenheimer, the director of the Institute for Advanced Study in Princeton, New Jersey, offered Dyson a lifetime appointment at the Institute, "for proving me wrong", in Oppenheimer's words. Dyson remained at the Institute until the end of his career. In 1957 he became a US citizen. From 1957 to 1961 Dyson worked on Project Orion, which proposed the possibility of space-flight using nuclear pulse propulsion. A prototype was demonstrated using conventional explosives, but the 1963 Partial Test Ban Treaty, in which Dyson was involved and which he supported, permitted only underground nuclear weapons testing, and the project was abandoned in 1965.

In 1958 Dyson was a member of the design team under Edward Teller for TRIGA, a small, inherently safe nuclear reactor used throughout the world in hospitals and universities for the production of medical isotopes.

In 1966, independently of Elliott H. Lieb and Walter Thirring, Dyson and Andrew Lenard published a paper proving that the Pauli exclusion principle plays the main role in the stability of matter. Hence it is not the electromagnetic repulsion between outer-shell orbital electrons that prevents two stacked wood blocks from coalescing into a single piece, but the exclusion principle applied to electrons and protons that generates the classical macroscopic normal force. In condensed matter physics, Dyson also analysed the phase transition of the Ising model in one dimension and spin waves.

Dyson also did work in a variety of topics in mathematics, such as topology, analysis, number theory and random matrices. In 1973 the number theorist Hugh Lowell Montgomery was visiting the Institute for Advanced Study and had just made his pair correlation conjecture concerning the distribution of the zeros of the Riemann zeta function. He showed his formula to the mathematician Atle Selberg, who said that it looked like something in mathematical physics and that Montgomery should show it to Dyson, which he did. Dyson recognized the formula as the pair correlation function of the Gaussian unitary ensemble, which physicists have studied extensively. This suggested that there might be an unexpected connection between the distribution of primes (2, 3, 5, 7, 11, ...) and the energy levels in the nuclei of heavy elements such as uranium.

Around 1979 Dyson worked with the Institute for Energy Analysis on climate studies. This group, under Alvin Weinberg's direction, pioneered multidisciplinary climate studies, including a strong biology group. Also during the 1970s, Dyson worked on climate studies conducted by the JASON defense advisory group.

Dyson retired from the Institute for Advanced Study in 1994. In 1998 he joined the board of the Solar Electric Light Fund.  he was president of the Space Studies Institute, the space research organization founded by Gerard K. O'Neill; as of 2013 he was on its board of trustees. Dyson was a longtime member of the JASON group.

Dyson won numerous scientific awards, but never a Nobel Prize. Nobel physics laureate Steven Weinberg said that the Nobel committee "fleeced" Dyson, but Dyson remarked in 2009, "I think it's almost true without exception if you want to win a Nobel Prize, you should have a long attention span, get hold of some deep and important problem and stay with it for ten years. That wasn't my style." Dyson was a regular contributor to The New York Review of Books, and published a memoir, Maker of Patterns: An Autobiography Through Letters in 2018.

In 2012 Dyson published (with William H. Press) a fundamental new result about the prisoner's dilemma in the Proceedings of the National Academy of Sciences of the United States of America. He wrote a foreword to a treatise on psychic phenomena in which he concluded that "ESP is real... but cannot be tested with the clumsy tools of science".

Family 
Dyson married his first wife, the Swiss mathematician Verena Huber, on 11 August 1950. They had two children, Esther and George, before divorcing in 1958. In November 1958 he married Imme Jung (born 1936) and they had four more children: Dorothy, Mia, Rebecca, and Emily Dyson.

Dyson's eldest daughter, Esther, is a digital technology consultant and investor; she has been called "the most influential woman in all the computer world". His son George is a historian of science, one of whose books is Project Orion: The Atomic Spaceship 1957–1965.

Death
Dyson died on 28 February 2020 at a hospital near Princeton, New Jersey, from complications following a fall. He was 96.

Concepts

Biotechnology and genetic engineering

Dyson admitted his record as a prophet was mixed, but thought it is better to be wrong than vague, and that in meeting the world's material needs, technology must be beautiful and cheap.

Dyson coined the term "green technologies", based on biology instead of physics or chemistry, to describe new species of microorganisms and plants designed to meet human needs. He argued that such technologies would be based on solar power rather than the fossil fuels whose use he saw as part of what he calls "gray technologies" of industry. He believed that genetically engineered crops, which he described as green, can help end rural poverty, with a movement based in ethics to end the inequitable distribution of wealth on the planet.

The Origin of Life

Dyson favored the dual origin theory: that life first formed as cells, then enzymes, and finally, much later, genes. This was first propounded by the Russian biochemist, Alexander Oparin. J. B. S. Haldane developed the same theory independently. In Dyson's version of the theory life evolved in two stages, widely separated in time. Because of the biochemistry he regards it as too unlikely that genes could have developed fully blown in one process. Current cells contain adenosine triphosphate or ATP and adenosine 5'-monophosphate or AMP, which greatly resemble each other but have completely different functions. ATP transports energy around the cell, and AMP is part of RNA and the genetic apparatus. Dyson proposed that in a primitive early cell containing ATP and AMP, RNA and replication came into existence only because of the similarity between AMP and RNA. He suggested that AMP was produced when ATP molecules lost two of their phosphate radicals, and then one cell somewhere performed Eigen's experiment and produced RNA.

There is no direct evidence for the dual origin theory, because once genes developed, they took over, obliterating all traces of the earlier forms of life. In the first origin, the cells were probably just drops of water held together by surface tension, teeming with enzymes and chemical reactions, and having a primitive kind of growth or replication. When the liquid drop became too big, it split into two drops. Many complex molecules formed in these "little city economies" and the probability that genes would eventually develop in them was much greater than in the prebiotic environment.

Dyson sphere 

In 1960 Dyson wrote a short paper for the journal Science titled "Search for Artificial Stellar Sources of Infrared Radiation". In it he speculated that a technologically advanced extraterrestrial civilization might surround its native star with artificial structures to maximize the capture of the star's energy. Eventually the civilization would enclose the star, intercepting electromagnetic radiation with wavelengths from visible light downward and radiating waste heat outward as infrared radiation. One method of searching for extraterrestrial civilizations would be to look for large objects radiating in the infrared range of the electromagnetic spectrum.

Dyson conceived that such structures would be clouds of asteroid-sized space habitats, though science fiction writers have preferred a solid structure: either way, such an artifact is often called a Dyson sphere, although Dyson used the term "shell". Dyson said that he used the term "artificial biosphere" in the article to mean a habitat, not a shape. The general concept of such an energy-transferring shell had been created decades earlier by science fiction writer Olaf Stapledon in his 1937 novel Star Maker, a source which Dyson credited publicly.

Dyson tree

Dyson also proposed the creation of a Dyson tree, a genetically engineered plant capable of growing inside a comet. He suggested that comets could be engineered to contain hollow spaces filled with a breathable atmosphere, thus providing self-sustaining habitats for humanity in the outer Solar System.

Space colonies

Dyson was interested in space travel since he was a child, reading such science fiction classics as Olaf Stapledon's Star Maker. As a young man, he worked for General Atomics on the nuclear-powered Orion spacecraft. He hoped Project Orion would put men on Mars by 1965, Saturn by 1970. For a quarter-century Dyson was unhappy about how the government conducts space travel:

Dyson still hoped for cheap space travel, but was resigned to waiting for private entrepreneurs to develop something new and inexpensive.

Space exploration

Dyson's eternal intelligence

Dyson proposed that an immortal group of intelligent beings could escape the prospect of heat death by extending time to infinity while expending only a finite amount of energy. This is also known as the Dyson scenario.

Dyson's transform

His concept "Dyson's transform" led to one of the most important lemmas of Olivier Ramaré's theorem: that every even integer can be written as a sum of no more than six primes.

Dyson series

The Dyson series, the formal solution of an explicitly time-dependent Schrödinger equation by iteration, and the corresponding Dyson time-ordering operator  an entity of basic importance in the mathematical formulation of quantum mechanics, are also named after Dyson.

Quantum physics and prime numbers
Dyson and Hugh Montgomery discovered an intriguing connection between quantum physics and Montgomery's pair correlation conjecture about the zeros of the zeta function. The primes 2, 3, 5, 7, 11, 13, 17, 19,… are described by the Riemann zeta function, and Dyson had previously developed a description of quantum physics based on m by m arrays of totally random numbers. Montgomery and Dyson discovered that the eigenvalues of these matrices are spaced apart in exactly the same manner as Montgomery conjectured for the nontrivial zeros of the zeta function. Andrew Odlyzko has verified the conjecture on a computer, using his Odlyzko–Schönhage algorithm to calculate many zeros.

There are in nature one, two, and three dimensional quasicrystals. Mathematicians define a quasicrystal as a set of discrete points whose Fourier transform is also a set of discrete points. Odlyzko has done extensive computations of the Fourier transform of the nontrivial zeros of the zeta function, and they seem to form a one-dimensional quasicrystal. This would in fact follow from the Riemann hypothesis.

Rank of a partition

In number theory and combinatorics rank of a partition of a positive integer is a certain integer associated with the partition. Dyson introduced the concept in a paper published in the journal Eureka. It was presented in the context of a study of certain congruence properties of the partition function discovered by the mathematician Srinivasa Ramanujan.

Crank of a partition

In number theory, the crank of a partition is a certain integer associated with the partition in number theory. Dyson first introduced the term without a definition in a 1944 paper in a journal published by the Mathematics Society of Cambridge University. He then gave a list of properties this yet-to-be-defined quantity should have. In 1988, George E. Andrews and Frank Garvan discovered a definition for the crank satisfying the properties Dyson had hypothesized.

Astrochicken

Astrochicken is the name given to a thought experiment Dyson expounded in his book Disturbing the Universe (1979). He contemplated how humanity could build a small, self-replicating automaton that could explore space more efficiently than a crewed craft could. He attributed the general idea to John von Neumann, based on a lecture von Neumann gave in 1948 titled The General and Logical Theory of Automata. Dyson expanded on von Neumann's automata theories and added a biological component.

Lumpers and splitters

Dyson suggested that philosophers can be broadly, if simplistically, divided into lumpers and splitters. These roughly correspond to Platonists, who regard the world as made up of ideas, and materialists, who imagine it divided into atoms.

Views

Climate change
Dyson agreed that technically humans and additional CO emissions contribute to warming. However, he felt that the benefits of additional CO outweighed any associated negative effects. He said that in many ways increased atmospheric carbon dioxide is beneficial, and that it is increasing biological growth, agricultural yields and forests. He believed that existing simulation models of climate change fail to account for some important factors, and that the results thus contain too great a margin of error to reliably predict trends. He argued that political efforts to reduce the causes of climate change distract from other global problems that should take priority and compared acceptance of climate change as real to religion.

In 2009, Dyson criticised James Hansen's climate-change activism. "The person who is really responsible for this overestimate of global warming is Jim Hansen. He consistently exaggerates all the dangers... Hansen has turned his science into ideology." Hansen responded that Dyson "doesn't know what he's talking about... If he's going to wander into something with major consequences for humanity and other life on the planet, then he should first do his homework- which he obviously has not done on global warming". Dyson replied that "[m]y objections to the global warming propaganda are not so much over the technical facts, about which I do not know much, but it's rather against the way those people behave and the kind of intolerance to criticism that a lot of them have." Dyson stated in an interview that the argument with Hansen was exaggerated by The New York Times, stating that he and Hansen are "friends, but we don't agree on everything."

Since originally taking interest in climate studies in the 1970s, Dyson suggested that carbon dioxide levels in the atmosphere could be controlled by planting fast-growing trees. He calculated that it would take a trillion trees to remove all carbon from the atmosphere. In a 2014 interview he said, "What I'm convinced of is that we don't understand climate… It will take a lot of very hard work before that question is settled."

Dyson was a member of the academic advisory council of the Global Warming Policy Foundation, a UK climate change denial lobbying group.

Warfare and weapons
At RAF Bomber Command, Dyson and colleagues proposed removing two gun turrets from Avro Lancaster bombers, to cut the catastrophic losses due to German fighters in the Battle of Berlin. A Lancaster without turrets could fly  faster and be much more maneuverable.

On hearing the news of the bombing of Hiroshima:

In 1967, in his capacity as a military adviser, Dyson wrote an influential paper on the issue of possible US use of tactical nuclear weapons in the Vietnam War. When a general said in a meeting, "I think it might be a good idea to throw in a nuke now and then, just to keep the other side guessing…" Dyson became alarmed and obtained permission to write a report on the pros and cons of using such weapons from a purely military point of view. (This report, Tactical Nuclear Weapons in Southeast Asia, published by the Institute for Defense Analyses, was obtained, with some redactions, by the Nautilus Institute for Security and Sustainability under the Freedom of Information act in 2002.) It was sufficiently objective that both sides in the debate based their arguments on it. Dyson says that the report showed that, even from a narrow military point of view, the US was better off not using nuclear weapons.

Dyson opposed the Vietnam War, the Gulf War and the invasion of Iraq. He supported Barack Obama in the 2008 US presidential election and The New York Times described him as a political liberal. He was one of 29 leading US scientists who wrote Obama a strongly supportive letter about his administration's 2015 nuclear deal with Iran.

Science and religion
Dyson was raised in what he described as a "watered-down Church of England Christianity". He was a nondenominational Christian and attended various churches, from Presbyterian to Roman Catholic. Regarding doctrinal or Christological issues, he said, "I am neither a saint nor a theologian. To me, good works are more important than theology."

Dyson partially disagreed with the remark by his fellow physicist Steven Weinberg that "With or without religion, good people can behave well and bad people can do evil; but for good people to do evil – that takes religion."

Dyson identified himself as agnostic about some of the specifics of his faith. For example, in reviewing The God of Hope and the End of the World by John Polkinghorne, Dyson wrote:

In The God Delusion (2006), evolutionary biologist and atheist activist Richard Dawkins singled out Dyson for accepting the Templeton Prize in 2000: "It would be taken as an endorsement of religion by one of the world's most distinguished physicists." In 2000, Dyson declared that he was a (non-denominational) Christian, and he disagreed with Dawkins on several subjects, such as evolution.

Named after Dyson
 Dyson conjecture
 Dyson equation
 Dyson numbers
 Dyson operator
 Dyson series
 Dyson sphere
 Dyson tree
 Dyson's crank
 Dyson's eternal intelligence
 Dyson's transform
 Dyson–Maleev spin wave theory 
 Schwinger–Dyson equation
 Thue–Siegel–Dyson–Roth theorem
 Feynman diagram, also known as Dyson graphs
 Wigner–Yamase–Dyson conjecture
 Gordon Freeman, a fictional character named after Dyson

Honors and awards
 Dyson was elected a Fellow of the Royal Society (FRS) in 1952.
 Dyson was elected to the American Academy of Arts and Sciences in 1958.
 Dyson was elected to the United States National Academy of Sciences in 1964.
 Dyson was awarded the Dannie Heineman Prize for Mathematical Physics in 1965, Lorentz Medal in 1966, Max Planck Medal in 1969, the J. Robert Oppenheimer Memorial Prize in 1970, the Harvey Prize in 1977 and Wolf Prize in 1981.
 Dyson was elected to the American Philosophical Society in 1976.
 In 1986, Dyson received the Golden Plate Award of the American Academy of Achievement.
 In 1989, Dyson was elected as an Honorary Fellow of Trinity College, University of Cambridge.
 In 1990, Dyson taught at Duke University as a Fritz London Memorial Lecturer.
 Dyson published a number of collections of speculations and observations about technology, science, and the future. In 1996, he was awarded the Lewis Thomas Prize for Writing about Science.
 In 1993, Dyson was given the Enrico Fermi Award.
 In 1995, he gave the Jerusalem-Harvard Lectures at the Hebrew University of Jerusalem, sponsored jointly by the Hebrew University and Harvard University Press that grew into the book Imagined Worlds.
 In 2000, Dyson was awarded the Templeton Prize for Progress in Religion.
 In 2003, Dyson was awarded the Telluride Tech Festival Award of Technology in Telluride, Colorado.
 In 2011, Dyson received as one of twenty distinguished Old Wykehamists at the Ad Portas celebration, the highest honor that Winchester College bestows.
 In 2018, Dyson received the first Presidential Science and Humanism Award from the American University of Beirut.

Publications

 (Winner of the National Book Critics Circle Award).

 

 A formerly secret document, declassified December 2002.

Documentaries
 To Mars by A-Bomb: The Secret History of Project Orion
 The Oakes
 Atomic Dream
 2001: The Science of Futures Past
 Cool It
 Nuclear Dynamite
 Gaia Symphony III
 The Starship and the Canoe
 The Day After Trinity
 The Untold History of the United States
 The Uncertainty Has Settled
 A Glorious Accident
 Freeman Dyson: Space Dreamer

References

Notes

Citations

Sources

Further reading

External links

 
 
 
 Oral history interview transcript with Freeman Dyson on 17 December 1986, American Institute of Physics, Niels Bohr Library & Archives

By Dyson
 Freeman Dyson at The New York Review of Books (content for subscribers only)
 "Heretical thoughts about science & society", essay by Freeman Dyson [8.7.2007] 
 Templeton Prize acceptance lecture 2000, by Freeman Dyson
 Imagined Worlds by Freeman Dyson, 1996: Chapter 1
 
 A radio interview with Freeman Dyson  Aired on the Lewis Burke Frumkes Radio Show in 2009.
 Suzan Mazur interviewing Dyson, 2012, CounterPunch
 "Pushing the Boundaries – A Conversation with Freeman Dyson" , Ideas Roadshow, 2014
 , Arthur C. Clarke Center for Human Imagination, February 2019.
 A ‘Rebel’ Without a Ph.D.

About Dyson
 "Freeman Dyson's Brain", interview by Stewart Brand at Wired, 1998
 2008 Video Interview with Freeman Dyson by Atomic Heritage Foundation, Voices of the Manhattan Project
 
 
 Remembering the Unstoppable Freeman Dyson
 
 Freeman J. Dyson, a Biographical Memoir by Ann Finkbeiner and William H. Press.

 
1923 births
2020 deaths
20th-century American mathematicians
21st-century American mathematicians
20th-century English mathematicians
21st-century English mathematicians
20th-century British physicists
21st-century British physicists
20th-century American physicists
21st-century American physicists
21st-century English memoirists
21st-century American memoirists
Writers from Berkshire
Academics of the University of Birmingham
Alumni of Trinity College, Cambridge
American Christians
American anti–nuclear weapons activists
American nuclear physicists
Cornell University alumni
Donegall Lecturers of Mathematics at Trinity College Dublin
English Christians
English anti–nuclear weapons activists
British emigrants to the United States
English nuclear physicists
English science writers
Enrico Fermi Award recipients
Fellows of the Royal Society
Foreign Members of the Russian Academy of Sciences
Futurologists
Institute for Advanced Study faculty
Lorentz Medal winners
Members of JASON (advisory group)
Members of the Bavarian Academy of Sciences
Members of the French Academy of Sciences
Members of the United States National Academy of Sciences
People educated at Winchester College
Scientists from Winchester
Philosophy writers
Quantum physicists
Space advocates
Templeton Prize laureates
Theoretical physicists
Wolf Prize in Physics laureates
Recipients of the Matteucci Medal
Winners of the Max Planck Medal
Writers about religion and science
Members of the American Philosophical Society
Accidental deaths from falls